981 Martina (prov. designation:  or ) is a carbonaceous Themistian asteroid from the outer regions of the asteroid belt, approximately  in diameter. It was discovered on 23 September 1917, by Russian astronomer Sergey Belyavsky at the Simeiz Observatory on the Crimean peninsula. The C/B-type asteroid has a rotation period of 11.3 hours. It was named after French historian and revolutionary Henri Martin (1810–1883).

Orbit and classification 

Martina is a core member of the Themis family, a very large family of carbonaceous asteroids, named after 24 Themis. It orbits the Sun in the outer asteroid belt at a distance of 2.5–3.7 AU once every 5 years and 5 months (1,992 days; semi-major axis of 3.1 AU). Its orbit has an eccentricity of 0.20 and an inclination of 2° with respect to the ecliptic.

Naming 

This minor planet was named after French historian and revolutionary politician, Henri Martin (1810–1883). The  was mentioned in The Names of the Minor Planets by Paul Herget in 1955.

Physical characteristics 

In the SDSS-based taxonomy, Martina is a carbonaceous C-type asteroid,
while in the classical Tholen classification, it has been classified as a CFU: asteroid, closest to a C-type and somewhat similar to an F-type, though with an unusual (U) and noisy spectra. In both the Tholen- and SMASS-like taxonomy of the Small Solar System Objects Spectroscopic Survey (S3OS2), Martina is a B-type asteroid, a "brighter" variant of the more common C-type. Members of the Themis family are typically classified as C-types with an albedo of 0.07, a value notably lower than for this asteroid at 0.10–0.13 (see below).

Rotation period 

In August 2004, a rotational lightcurve of Martina was obtained from photometric observations by David Higgins at the Hunters Hill Observatory  in Australia. Lightcurve analysis gave a rotation period of  hours with a brightness variation of  magnitude. Astronomers at the Palomar Transient Factory in California also determined the period in the R-band on two occasions, measuring 11.263 and 11.268 hours with an amplitude of 0.24 and 0.15 in 2010 and 2012, respectively.

Diameter and albedo 

According to the survey carried out by the Infrared Astronomical Satellite IRAS, the Japanese Akari satellite, and the NEOWISE mission of NASA's Wide-field Infrared Survey Explorer, Franklina measures between 28.8 and 32.5 kilometers in diameter and its surface has an albedo between 0.10 and 0.13. The Collaborative Asteroid Lightcurve Link adopts the results from IRAS, that is, an albedo of 0.1254 and a diameter of 28.87 kilometers, based on an absolute magnitude of 10.9.

References

External links 
 Lightcurve Database Query (LCDB), at www.minorplanet.info
 Dictionary of Minor Planet Names, Google books
 Discovery Circumstances: Numbered Minor Planets (1)-(5000) – Minor Planet Center
 
 

000981
Discoveries by Sergei Belyavsky
Named minor planets
000981
19170923